Tizzard Island is an uninhabited island in Chincoteague Bay. The island is within the borders of Worcester County in the state of Maryland. Several structures exist on Tizzard Island, though none of them are inhabited and many of them are decaying.

References 

Uninhabited islands of Maryland